Baike Quanshuo is a Chinese variety show produced by Hunan Broadcasting System. The series debuted on November 30, 2009. The show was hosted by Xie Na (until February 8, 2010) and Li Weijia. It was broadcast every Monday through Thursday at 7:30 pm. After Xie Na left the show, she was replaced by Fang Qiong.

External links
http://baikequanshuo.kljz.org
http://ent.hunantv.com/v/hunantv/bkqs/

Chinese variety television shows
2009 Chinese television series debuts
2011 Chinese television series endings
Hunan Television original programming